The Institute of Business Administration (IBA), Karachi; (انسٹيٹيوٹ آف بزنس ايڈمنسٹريشن) is a public university in Karachi, Sindh, Pakistan.

Academics

Admission 

Admission to IBA KARACHI is based on Entry Test, SAT/ACT and Interview.

Programs Offered 
At undergraduate level, IBA offers degrees in Business Administration, Accounting and Finance, Computer Science, Economics, Economics and Mathematics, Social Sciences and Liberal Arts.

The graduate programs offered by the IBA include degrees in Business Administration, MBA Executive, Computer Science, Economics, Islamic Banking and Finance, Journalism, Management, Data Sciences, Finance and Mathematics.

The doctoral programs offered at the Institute include degrees in Computer Science, Economics and Mathematics.

Affiliation

 IBA was accredited by the South Asian Quality Assurance System (SAQS) in 2011.
 CFA University Partner and the first university in Pakistan to be granted that status by the CFA Institute.

Controversies/Harassment Cases 
In 2018, Dr Tiago Ferreira Lopes who is a Portuguese national was accused of seeking sexual favors from the male students, following which a case was prepared against him. It was then reported that Dr Lopes was quietly asked by the administration of IBA to leave the country after it was verified that he was continuously abusing his position to demand sexual favors from male students.

In October 2020, a female faculty member of IBA reported a non-teaching employee of the campus of harassment which was then investigated by the IBA's Anti-Harassment Committee. The accused employee was barred from entering IBA premises until the completion of the inquiry.

On 25 August 2021, a student named Mohammad Gibrail witnessed an incident where a female employee of the finance department was allegedly harassed by a male employee Tanveer Ahmed in a supervisory position. He shared the whole incident in detail in a Facebook post. On September 17, a large number of IBA students protested with the chants of “We Want Justice!”, “IBA Stands Against Harassment”, “Stop Sheltering Harassment.” On 29 September 2021, the Institute expelled Mohammad Gibrail for exposing alleged harassment on campus with the reason stating that IBA appreciates the student for pointing out issues which are of concern to them and our community but the institute took the decision to expel the complainant for not using the right channel to report the sexual harassment.

Notable alumni

Asad Umar - Politician, serving in the Government of Pakistan, and the former CEO of Engro Corporation.
Ashir Azeem - Pakistani-Canadian actor, director and former civil servant.
Ghias Khan - Businessman and entrepreneur.
Irfanullah Khan Marwat - Former Minister of Education Sindh.
Kanwal Ahmed - Founder of Soul Sisters Pakistan (est.2013)  and Executive Producer of "Conversations with Kanwal."
Mahoor Shahzad - Badminton player
Mamnoon Hussain - Former President, Islamic Republic of Pakistan.
Muhammad Uzair -  Pakistani economist, senior bureaucrat, and professor emeritus.
Muhammad Zubair - Pakistani politician and former Governor of Sindh.
Quentin D'Silva - Pakistani Christian business executive.
Raihan Merchant - Chairman and CEO of Z2C Pakistan, Chairman of Brainchild Communications Ltd and Blitz (Pvt) Ltd.
Shamim Rajani -  Entrepreneur and businesswoman.
Shaukat Aziz - Former Prime Minister of Pakistan.
Sheheryar Munawar - Film and television actor.
Sikandar Sultan - Founder and Chairman of Shan Food Industries.
Taha Siddiqui - Pakistani journalist based in Paris.
Tipu Sharif - Turkish-born television actor.
Narmeen Khan - Managing Director of Mondelēz Pakistan.
Sabir Sami - Global CEO of KFC.

References

External links
 Official website

 
Business schools in Pakistan
Public universities and colleges in Sindh
Educational institutions established in 1955
1955 establishments in Pakistan